Tomáš Vrťo (born 6 September 1988) is a Czech football player who currently plays for Energetyk ROW Rybnik. His former club was FK Senica.

External links

References

1987 births
Living people
Czech footballers
Czech First League players
Slovak Super Liga players
FC Baník Ostrava players
FK Senica players
Expatriate footballers in Slovakia
Expatriate footballers in Poland
Association football forwards